Erle Cox (15 August 1873 – 20 November 1950) was an Australian journalist and science fiction writer.

Life 
Cox was born at Emerald Hill, Victoria, on 15 August 1873, the second son of Ross Cox, who had emigrated from his native Dublin as a youth during the early gold rush days of the 1850s. He was educated at Castlemaine Grammar School and Melbourne Grammar School. Following school, Cox worked as a wine-grower near Rutherglen, Victoria, before moving to Tasmania.  On 24 December 1901 he married Mary Ellen Kilborn and some time later the couple settled in Melbourne.

In 1921, Cox joined the editorial staff of The Argus newspaper as a writer of special articles and book reviewer under the pen name 'The Chiel'; later he was the principal movie critic. In 1946 he joined the staff of The Age after being given notice from The Argus.

Cox died in 1950 after a long illness.

Works
Three early works were published in the Lone Hand Magazine: Reprieve, Diplomacy and The Social Code.
 Out of the Silence, his best known novel, is set in Australia, and involves the discovery of a gigantic, buried sphere, containing the accumulated knowledge of a past civilization. It was published by The Argus in weekly instalments over a six-month period in 1919. The first Australian edition in book form was published by Vidler, in 1925. The same year a British edition appeared (Hamilton), and in 1928 an American edition (Rae D. Henkle). In 1934, the book was adapted to a comic-strip format by an artist identified only as Hix, likely Reginald Ernest Hicks. This pictorial version was published daily in The Argus in 120 episodes from August to December. In the same year, the novel was dramatised for radio presentation as a 25-part serial. The SF Encyclopedia notes that: "The novel exhibits some racist overtones" in reference to the eugenically inspired character Odi, who brought about the supremacy of a white race by devising a ray that killed only black people.  The SF Encyclopedia does not, however, reveal that this was a small historical reminiscence of a figure in the deep historical past, and that the reader of the novel is told that Odi "was judged and condemned as the greatest criminal our world had ever produced." The device of a buried sphere from a lost, advanced civilization clearly influenced René Barjavel's best-settling 1966 French science fiction novel La Nuit des temps, translated into English as The Ice People (1971).
 Fools Harvest was published as a fourteen-part serial in The Argus, in 1938, and was published in book form the following year by Robertson Mullen with two extra chapters.
 The Missing Angel, the third and final book by Cox, was published by Robertson Mullen in 1947.

References

Further reading

External links
 Out of the Silence at Project Gutenberg Australia
 The Missing Angel at Project Gutenberg Australia
 Read Chapter 1 of the original edition of Out of the Silence from the Lost Worlds Australia Anthology.
  – reprinted from The Somerset Gazette (no. 5, Jan 1971)
 
 

1873 births
1950 deaths
People educated at Melbourne Grammar School
Australian journalists
Australian science fiction writers
Australian fantasy writers
Australian male novelists
The Argus (Melbourne) people
People from South Melbourne
Writers from Melbourne